Ange Leccia (born 19 April 1952) is a  contemporary French painter, photographer and film-maker. He works in Paris primarily with photography and video.

Life and career
Leccia was born in Minerbio, Barrettali commune, in Corsica, and studied fine arts. Initially he was engaged in both painting and photography, but as time passed he devoted himself more to photography and video as his chosen media.

Leccia is a lecturer at the École nationale supérieure d'arts de Cergy-Pontoise (ENSAPC). He also directs research for young artists at the Palais de Tokyo in Paris.

Leccia's first film was the short, Stridura, in 1980. In December 2004, his film Azé, made in 1999, was released. Like his earlier work, such as the shorts Île de beauté (Island of Beauty) (1996) and Gold (2000), both co-produced with Dominique Gonzalez-Foerster, in Azé Ange Leccia  continued to stress the light and sound effects.

Selected exhibitions
 2004 : Chateau de Tours, France
 2003 : Galerie Almine Rech, Paris, France
 1999 : National Museum of Contemporary Art, Oslo, Norway
 1998 : Musée Nicéphore Nièpce, Chalon-sur-Saône, France
 1996 : Villa Medici, Rome, Italy
 1995 : Art at the Edge, Atlanta, USA
 1992 : Contemporary Art Museum, Houston, USA
 1990 : Le Magasin, CNAC, Grenoble, France
 1985 : ARC / Musée d'Art Moderne de la Ville de Paris, France

Notes

References
 Simas, Joseph   (1990) "Face to Face: meeting the art of Ange Leccia" Arts magazine 64: p. 48
 Di Pietrantonio, Giacinto (1991) "Ange Leccia" Flash Art (International Edition) no. 160 (October 1991) p. 118-21, an interview with Ange Leccia
 Vedrenne, Elisabeth  (1997) "Les sons et Lumieres d'Ange Leccia" ("The sound and light of Ange Leccia") L'Oeil no. 490 (November 1997), p. 34, in French
 Beausse, Pascal (2002) "Ange Leccia's slow dazzle" Art Press no. 277 (March 2002), p. 39-43
 Frodon, Jean-Michel (2006) "Le songe de la lumiere" Cahiers du Cinéma no. 611 (April 2006), p. 37, in French
 Lequeux, Emmanuelle (2007) "Entretien avec Ange Leccia"  Beaux Arts Magazine no. 274 (April 2007), p. 112, an interview with Ange Leccia in French

External links
 
 Galerie Anselm Dreher photograph of Ange Leccia's "Lolita" 1988, a BMW K 100 RS with soundtrack "Lolita" by Kubrick 1954

French film directors
20th-century French photographers
1952 births
Living people
French contemporary artists
French people of Corsican descent
21st-century French photographers
People from Haute-Corse